This is an episode list for the CBS television series Cold Case.

Seasons one through three and season six comprised 23 hour-long episodes each, while season four included an additional episode for a total of 24. Season five comprised the fewest episodes, with 18, as it aired during the 2007-08 Writers Guild of America strike. The last season, season seven, which finished its run in May 2010, began airing in September 2009 and consisted of 22 episodes.

A total of 156 episodes were aired over seven seasons.

Series overview

Episodes

Season 1 (2003–04)

Season 2 (2004–05)

Season 3 (2005–06)

Season 4 (2006–07)

Season 5 (2007–08)

Season 6 (2008–09)

Season 7 (2009–10)

References

External links

 Warner Bros. Cold Case official site
 

Cold Case
Cold Case
Cold Case